NGC 7139 is a planetary nebula located in the constellation of Cepheus. It was discovered on November 5, 1787 by astronomer William Herschel.

See also
 List of NGC objects
 Planetary nebulae

References

External links
 

Planetary nebulae
Cepheus (constellation)
7139
17871105
Discoveries by William Herschel